Hylaea  is a genus of flowering plants in the family Apocynaceae, first described as a genus in 1999. It is native to the Amazon rainforest of southern Venezuela and northwestern Brazil.

Species
 Hylaea arborescens (Monach.) J.F.Morales - Amazonas State of Venezuela
 Hylaea leptoloba (Monach.) J.F.Morales - Amazonas State of Brazil

References

Echiteae
Apocynaceae genera
Flora of the Amazon